Josef Georg Kornhäusel (13 November 1782, in Vienna - 31 October 1860, in Vienna) was an Austrian architect of the first half of the 19th century.  He primarily employed the contemporary style of Neoclassical architecture, moving to the Biedermeier style in his later oevre.

Kornhäusel was court architect to Johann I Joseph, Prince of Liechtenstein, for whom he had built palaces, theaters and garden pavilions.

Major works 
 Domestic architecture:  Numerous apartment buildings and villas in Vienna and Baden
 Theater in der Josefstadt, 1822
 Interior of the museum Albertina, 1822
 Stadttempel, the main synagogue of the Jewish community in Vienna, 1824-1826
 Extension to the Schottenstift, 1826-1832
 Extension of the château in Hnojník
 Habsburg Palace in Cieszyn, 1838-1840

External links

References

1782 births
1860 deaths
18th-century Austrian people
18th-century Austrian architects
19th-century Austrian architects
Architects from Vienna